Sycamore Pictures is an American production company founded by producers Ben Nearn and Tom Rice.

History
The company was formed in 2011 with a focus on producing films with a "more redemptive tone" suitable for families. Nearn, formerly an investment banker who moved on to become COO and a minority investor in Cross Creek Pictures, maintains the company's Memphis offices; Rice, an independent film producer and writer, maintains the Los Angeles office. The startup funds for Sycamore were raised by Nearn from investors both from the Memphis area and elsewhere, with a business model based on profit participation by actors, directors and creative personnel.

The company's first production, The Way Way Back, had its debut at the Sundance Film Festival in 2013, where distribution rights were purchased for 9.75 million, reportedly the largest distribution deal made at the festival that year.

Begin Again (2014) has been described as "an old-fashioned, let’s-put-on-a-show movie musical disguised as an indie relationship drama" and as "that real rarity, a feel-good story of friendship — not sexual love — between a man and woman."

Merry Friggin' Christmas, scheduled for release in late 2014, features Robin Williams in the last movie he made before his death in 2014.

Filmography

References

External links
 

American companies established in 2011
Companies based in Los Angeles
Film production companies of the United States
Mass media companies established in 2011
Television production companies of the United States
Privately held companies of the United States